Orthopedic Sports Medicine is a subspecialty of orthopedic medicine and sports medicine.  The word orthopaedic derives from “ortho” which is the Greek root for “straight” and “pais” which is the Greek root for child. During the early history of orthopaedic medicine, orthopaedists used braces, among other things, to make a child “straight.”

Subspecialty: Orthopaedic Sports Medicine
The phrase “sports medicine” is not specific to one career/profession. It instead, encompasses a group of professionals from various disciplines whose focus is the health of an athlete. Athletes can be all ages and play on all different levels (youth, high school, collegiate, recreational, and professional). 

Orthopaedic sports medicine is the investigation, preservation, and restoration by medical, surgical, and rehabilitative means to all structures of the musculoskeletal system affected by athletic activity.

Orthopaedic Sports Medicine Specialist
Any Accredited Council for Graduate Medical Education (ACGME) residency trained orthopaedist can practice orthopaedic sports medicine. Their training specifically provides them with the skills to care for athletes’ musculoskeletal needs.

What They Do
Orthopaedic sports medicine specialists…
 Condition and train athletes.
 Provide fitness advice relating to athletic performance.
 Give advice on athletic performance and the impact of dietary supplements, pharmaceuticals, and nutrition on athletes’ short- and long-term health and performance.
 Coordinate medical care within athletic team settings, including other health care professionals, such as athletic trainers, physical therapists, and non-orthopaedic physicians.
 Conduct on-the-field evaluation and management of illnesses and injuries.

What they Know
Orthopaedic sports medicine specialists have a knowledge of…
 Soft tissue biomechanics, injury healing, and repair.
 Treatment options, both surgical and non-surgical, as they relate to sports-specific injuries and competition.
 Principles and techniques of rehabilitation that enable the athlete to return to competition as quickly and safely as possible.
 Knowledge of athletic equipment and orthotic devices (braces, foot orthoses, etc.) and their use in prevention and management of athletic injuries.

Schooling
A person interested in becoming an orthopaedic sports medicine specialist must complete four years of medical school. After their undergraduate schooling is completed, training continues with a five year residency in orthopaedics. In order to sub-specialize, which is the case with an orthopaedic sports medicine, a one-year fellowship is required, although some programs extend two to four years. 

After they have finished their training and have graduated from an accredited residency, orthopaedic surgeons are eligible to become certified by the American Board of Orthopaedic Surgery (ABOS). Certification by the Board is required in order to practice. In addition, the orthopaedist who plans on specializing in sports medicine must complete certification in the sports medicine sub-specialty which is administered by the ABOS. 
Education does not stop there; orthopaedists are required to take continuing education classes to maintain their license.

Careers
Orthopaedist specializing in sports medicine have various options of employment: from serving as a team’s physician (high school, college, and professional), to running a private practice, to working in the academic setting.

According to a salary.com, the data they collected from HR reported data in August 2008 showed that an orthopaedic surgeon, on average, made about $606,307 a year not including bonuses and benefits.

References

External links
 American Academy of Orthopedic Surgeons
 American Orthopaedic Society for Sports Medicine
 American Board of Othopaedic Surgery
 American College of Sports Medicine

Orthopedic surgical procedures
Sports medicine